The Delegated Authority for the Security of the Republic, is a government agency within the Council of Ministers with the aim of coordinating the Prime Minister and intelligence agencies. The current office holder is Alfredo Mantovano, Secretary of the Council of Ministers in the government of Giorgia Meloni.

History
The Delegated Authority was foreseen with the Italian intelligence reform of 2007 promoted by the government of Romano Prodi and officially implemented on 13 August 2007. In October 2007 Prodi delegated the authority to the Enrico Luigi Micheli. In 2011, Prime Minister Mario Monti initially did not delegate the mandate, maintaining his prerogatives over Italian intelligence. Even Prime Minister Giuseppe Conte did not appoint a delegated authority, keeping responsibility for it in his powers for almost the entire duration of his two governments.

In June 2021, the Council of Ministers of the Mario Draghi government approved the establishment of a National Cybersecurity Agency, reporting to the Prime Minister and the Delegated Authority.

List of Undersecretaries

References

Delegated Authority